raw tension e.p. (stylized as >Raw Tension<) is an EP by haloblack, released on August 23, 1995, by Fifth Colvmn Records. It contains outtakes and remixes from the band's first two full-length Haloblack albums, Tension Filter and funkyhell. Intended to be pressed on compact disc in 1995 with its six songs contained in one continuous track, the EP was instead issued on cassette with an additional seventh track and te songs separated. On March 7, 2001, the CD-R version was released with original intended track listing intact on digital format.

Track listing

Personnel 
Adapted from the raw tension e.p. liner notes.

haloblack
 Bryan Barton (as Bryan Black) – vocals, instruments, production
 Bill Morrisette – production
 Damien Ray – instruments

Additional performers
 Joel Allard – guitar ("Blood Rich Heart")
 Jim Marcus – vocals ("No Chance Control (Part 2)")
 Jason McNinch – remixing ("Balance" (Warzone))
 Paul Robb – sampler ("Hack")

Release history

References

External links 
 
 raw tension e.p. at Bandcamp
 raw tension CD at Bandcamp
 

1995 EPs
Haloblack albums
Fifth Colvmn Records EPs